The eighth and final season of the ABC sitcom Full House originally aired between September 27, 1987 and May 23, 1995.

Though he is featured on the DVD cover and credited as a cast member, Scott Weinger does not appear in this season nor is there any mention of Steve Hale until the series finale in which makes a brief guest appearance.

This was the show's final season, as ABC decided to cancel it in 1995 due to rising production costs. The series would continue in the Netflix spin-off Fuller House, released in 2016.

Plot
In the final season, Danny begins to date Gia's mother, Claire. Rebecca is promoted to producer of Wake Up San Francisco. The Rippers fire Jesse, which prompts him to start another band called Hot Daddy and The Monkey Puppets. D.J. is in her final year of high school and aspires to enroll at Stanford. After her break-up with Steve, she briefly dates rich boy, Nelson and a guitarist named Viper, neither of which are as successful. Stephanie is in the seventh grade. Michelle begins third grade along with her friends Teddy, Aaron, Derek and Lisa. Nicky and Alex start preschool.

Main cast 

 John Stamos as Jesse Katsopolis
 Bob Saget as Danny Tanner 
 Dave Coulier as Joey Gladstone
 Candace Cameron as D.J. Tanner
 Jodie Sweetin as Stephanie Tanner
 Mary-Kate & Ashley Olsen as Michelle Tanner
 Lori Loughlin as Rebecca Donaldson-Katsopolis
 Andrea Barber as Kimmy Gibbler
 Blake & Dylan Tuomy-Wilhoit as Nicky & Alex Katsopolis

Episodes

See also 
 List of Full House episodes

References 

General references 
 
 

1994 American television seasons
1995 American television seasons
8